The Istriana is an endangered breed of domestic goat indigenous to Istria and the Karst regions of the northern Adriatic, from north-east Italy to Croatia and Slovenia. A population of about 100 head was documented in the Italian province of Gorizia in the 1980s; there is no more recent data. In Croatia, where raising any goat not of the Swiss Saanen breed was illegal in the 1940s and 1950s, it has largely disappeared; a study is under way to establish whether it may be recoverable.

In Italy the Istriana is one of the forty-three autochthonous goat breeds of limited distribution for which a herdbook is kept by the Associazione Nazionale della Pastorizia, the Italian national association of sheep- and goat-breeders. No numbers have been recorded in the herd-book for many years; however, a population of 80 was reported to DAD-IS in 2005. Its conservation status in Italy was listed as "critical" by the FAO in 2007.

References

Goat breeds
Meat goat breeds
Goat breeds originating in Italy